Penn & Teller's Sin City Spectacular was a weekly American television variety show hosted by Penn and Teller that appeared on the FX Networks from August 10, 1998 - June 30, 1999. The show's aim was to revive the genuine variety shows from the past, such as The Ed Sullivan Show, where, as Penn put it, you could see Pavarotti singing an aria, followed by a man with trained performing housecats.

Description
Sin City Spectacular was an hour-long program that featured many acts on the program that were bizarre, sideshow-type performances. These type of performances included Katzen, the tattooed lady who ate bugs, and her husband, the Enigma (also covered with tattoos), who swallowed swords and lightbulbs, and had two horns surgically implanted into his forehead. Often celebrities appeared performing previously unknown talents, such as actor French Stewart singing and dancing Hooray Pornography, Andy Dick tap-dancing, or Jerry Springer singing while the dancers fight behind him a la The Jerry Springer Show.

Musical highlights were Fred, an old-time barbershop quartet, singing "I Wanna Be Sedated"; Michael McKean as a distraught Edgar Allan Poe who breaks into a disco extravaganza with the Eight Deadly Sin Dancers', and comedian Carlos Alazraqui transforming the tradition of Irish River Dancing into a bizarre S&M spanking fantasywhich were the brainchild of writer Martin Olson. Outstanding straight musical acts like Dr. John and John Popper also appeared. In one performance, Popper jammed on the harmonica while Penn narrated a story and Teller illustrated it with  card tricks. Other performers included comedians Kevin Meaney, Don Novello, Otto and George, Bobcat Goldthwait, Eric Idle, and Martin Mull.

Each show opened with a solo Penn and Teller performance. Some of their pieces, like "Cuffed to a Creep" where Penn finds himself handcuffed to a bizarre stranger (Teller) on a park bench, and "Balloon of Blood" in which Penn eloquently describes the strength and vulnerability of humanity, were borrowed from their stage show, while others, like Teller's "zippo lighter" piece, were written especially for the TV show.

The FX network chose not to renew the show after the first season.

Crew
Bruce Gowers, Kent Weed, Ron de Moraes, Directors
Michael L. Weinberg, Supervising Producer 	
Paul Buccieri, executive producer
Robert Weiss, executive producer
Carole Propp, coordinating producer
Penn & Teller, co-executive producer / writers
Martin Olson, producer / writer
Colman deKay, writing supervisor
Jamy Ian Swiss, writer
Michael Goudeau, writer
Gary Stockdale, Composer, Music Director	
Bruce Ryan, production design	 	
Birgitte Mann, costume design 	
Tiger Martina, choreographer  
Skip Burrows, property master, special effects
John Monarch, Production Manager
Kent Belli, Production Accountant
Veronica Garrison, Las Vegas Production Coordinator
Mark Mc Quown, construction coordinator
Kieran Healy, lighting
Laurie D. Muslow, talent executive
Adam Brauer, producer/writer

Nomination
 Sin City Spectacular was nominated for Emmy for Outstanding Music and Lyrics for the 1999 Emmy Awards.

References

External links

1998 American television series debuts
1999 American television series endings
1990s American variety television series
American television magic shows
FX Networks original programming
Television shows directed by Bruce Gowers